Rachel's Tears: The Spiritual Journey of Columbine Martyr Rachel Scott is a non-fiction book about Rachel Scott, the first victim of the Columbine High School massacre.

Written by her parents, including her journal entries, it is part of a nationwide school outreach program and ministry. They present Rachel as being killed for her Christian affirmation.

Darrell Scott traveled around the United States to promote the book. He said that during his travels he heard many stories about school death threats and that this compelled him to spread the message of his daughter. Scott said the number was "by far, more than are reported in the media."

Bibliography
Darrell Scott, Beth Nimmo, Steve Rabey, Rachel's Tears: The Spiritual Journey of Columbine Martyr Rachel Scott, Thomas Nelson Publishers, 2000,

See also
 She Said Yes: The Unlikely Martyrdom of Cassie Bernall

References

Further reading
"Columbine dad to speak to teachers." Plainview Daily Herald. August 12, 2004.
"Making a difference Father of Columbine massacre victim Rachel Scott spreads message of love, hope." Herald & Review. February 22, 2003. B1.

External links
Rachel's Tears: The Spiritual Journey of Columbine Martyr Rachel Scott Reviews
Customer Reviews for Thomas Nelson Rachel's Tears
Quotes from Rachel Scott's diary
Columbine victim tribute site, contains information about Rachel Scott
Website dedicated to Rachel Scott, contains photographs, music and messages from Rachel's family

American biographies
Thomas Nelson (publisher) books
2000 non-fiction books
Works about the Columbine High School massacre